Thomas Foster (30 September 1883 – 27 June 1974) was an Australian cricketer. He played one first-class match for New South Wales in 1903/04.

See also
 List of New South Wales representative cricketers

References

External links
 

1883 births
1974 deaths
Australian cricketers
New South Wales cricketers
Cricketers from Sydney